Pithoragarh Legislative Assembly constituency is one of the 70 Legislative Assembly constituencies of Uttarakhand state in India.

It is part of Pithoragarh district.

Members of the Legislative Assembly

Election results

2022

2019 by-election
A by-election was needed due to the death of sitting MLA, Prakash Pant. The by-election was won by his widow, Chandra Pant.

2017

See also
 List of constituencies of the Uttarakhand Legislative Assembly
 Pithoragarh district

References

External links
  

Pithoragarh district
Assembly constituencies of Uttarakhand